Kalateh-ye Now (also Romanized as Kalāteh-ye Now, Kalāteh Nau, and Kalāteh Now; also known as Kūh-e Now) is a village in Zirkuh Rural District, Central District, Zirkuh County, South Khorasan Province, Iran. At the 2006 census, its population was 93, in 23 families.

References 

Populated places in Zirkuh County